Mary Kini Lifu (born 15 October 1994 in Honiara, Solomon Islands) is a Solomon Islander weightlifter. She competed at the 2020 Summer Olympics in the women's 55 kg event.

Career 
She won a silver medal at the 2015 Pacific Games in the 53 kg weight category.

In 2018 she competed at the Commonwealth Games, finishing ninth in the women's 53 kg event on the Gold Coast.

In 2019 she won the gold medal at the 2019 Pacific Games in 55 kg weight category.

Major results

References

External links 
 
 
 
 

1994 births
Living people
Solomon Islands female weightlifters
People from Honiara
Weightlifters at the 2018 Commonwealth Games
Commonwealth Games competitors for the Solomon Islands
Weightlifters at the 2020 Summer Olympics
Olympic weightlifters of the Solomon Islands